The Zosima Shashkov is a Dmitriy Furmanov-class (302, BiFa129M) Soviet/Russian river cruise ship, cruising in the Volga – Neva basin between Russian old and new capitals: Moscow and Saint Petersburg. The ship was built by VEB Elbewerften Boizenburg/Roßlau at their shipyard in Boizenburg, East Germany, and entered service in 1986. She was refurbished in 2012. Zosima Shashkov is currently operated by Vodohod, a Russian river cruise line, and her home port is Nizhny Novgorod. The ship is named after the Bolshevik commissar and minister of the Sea and River Fleet of the USSR Zosima Alekseyevich Shashkov.

Features
The ship has one restaurant with panoramic views, night club-restaurant, three bars:  Piano Bar, Coffee Bar and Conference Bar, sauna, solarium and onboard boutique.

See also
 List of river cruise ships

References

External links
Zosima Shashkov on the Vodohod homepage
Zosima Shashkov on the RiverFleet.ru 

1986 ships
River cruise ships
Passenger ships of Russia